Ås (from Old Norse áss 'ridge') is a locality situated in Krokom Municipality, Jämtland County, Sweden with 1,218 inhabitants in 2010.

Nearby villages include Sem, Sörbyn, Hållsta, Täng, Tängtorpet, Dille, Backen, Trättgärde, Kännåsen, Lien, Torsta, Hov, Ösa, Birka.

References 

Populated places in Krokom Municipality
Jämtland